The Distinguished Service Cross (DSC) is a military decoration awarded to personnel of the Australian Defence Force. It is awarded for distinguished command and leadership in action. The DSC was introduced in 1991 and is the highest distinguished service decoration in the Australian Honours System. Recipients of the Distinguished Service Cross are entitled to use the post-nominal letters "DSC". Since its inception 115 awards have been made—which includes eight first Bars and one second Bar.

Government allowance
The Government of Australia may grant an allowance to veterans or serving members of the Australian Defence Force who have been awarded the Distinguished Service Cross, or other awards for gallantry. In November 2007, this allowance was A$2.10 per fortnight.

Description
The Distinguished Service Cross is described as: "...a modified Maltese Cross of nickel-silver ensigned with the Crown of St Edward. The obverse bears a Federation Star surmounted on a disc of flames. The medal has a nickel-silver suspender bar. The medal ribbon has a central ochre-red stripe surrounded by narrower silver-blue stripes."

Distinct recipients
Since its inception, eight bars have been awarded;
One Bar
 Colonel V, DSC & Bar – Citation: For distinguished command and leadership in action as a commanding officer on Operation Slipper in Afghanistan in June 2009.
 Lieutenant Colonel P, DSC & Bar – Citation: For distinguished command and leadership in action.
 Major General Michael Peter Crane, DSC & Bar, AM – Citation: distinguished command and leadership in warlike operations as the Commander of Joint Task Force 633 on Operation SLIPPER from October 2012 to September 2013.
 Lieutenant Colonel F, DSC & Bar – Citation: For distinguished command and leadership in warlike operations during Operation SLIPPER.
 Brigadier Daniel Fortune, DSC & Bar – Citation: for distinguished command and leadership in warlike operations on Operation SLIPPER.
 Brigadier John William Shanahan, DSC & Bar, AM, OBE – Citation: For distinguished command and leadership in warlike operations as the North Atlantic Treaty Organisation Resolute Support Headquarters Chief of Operations and as Commanding General Train Advise Assist Command – South in Afghanistan from September 2017 to February 2019.

Two Bars
 Lieutenant Colonel Ian Langford, DSC & Two Bars. Originally reported as "Lieutenant Colonel I" due to Special Forces protocols for name suppression. First citation: For distinguished command and leadership in warlike operations as Commanding Officer of Special Operations Task Group on Operation Slipper. Second Citation: For distinguished leadership in warlike operations as part of a Special Operations Force on Operation OKRA from September 2014 to February 2015.

See also
Australian Honours Order of Precedence
List of recipients of the Distinguished Service Cross
:Category:Recipients of the Distinguished Service Cross (Australia)

References

Military awards and decorations of Australia

1991 establishments in Australia
Awards established in 1991